is a Japanese band formed in 2004 under the record company Dreamusic Incorporated.

Their music is mostly hip hop, but is also inspired by pop and rock music. All members in the group are from Hachiōji, Tokyo. They are known for featuring celebrities in their promotion videos and singles jackets. The band is also known as Fan-mon (ファンモン) in short.

History

Their fourth single, "Lovin' Life", is a charted hit that recorded long sales and received multiple high rankings on the Japanese sales charts in the first half of 2007. In July 2007, they released another single, "Chippoke na Yūki". They attracted fans with their high energy live performances all over Japan and continued to gain popularity in various popular media.

On 10 February 2010, the band released their first greatest-hits album Funky Monkey Babys Best. The album debuted at number one on the Japanese Oricon weekly charts with the first week sales of around 255,000 copies.

They announced their intent to disband after their final tour in 2013 on 29 November 2012. Their last live concerts were held at the Tokyo Dome on 1 and 2 June 2013.

Their song ちっぽけな勇気 was also featured in the Japanese television series Asuko March.

Members
  – MC
  – MC
  – DJ

Discography

Singles

Albums

See also

 List of Dreamusic Incorporated artists
 List of Japanese hip-hop musicians
 List of Japanese rock bands
 Music of Japan

References

External links
  (in Japanese), the band's official website
 

2004 establishments in Japan
21st-century Japanese musicians
Japanese hip hop groups
Japanese pop music groups
Japanese rock music groups
Musical groups established in 2004
Musical groups from Hachiōji, Tokyo
Japanese musical trios
Musical groups disestablished in 2013
Dreamusic artists
Japanese boy bands
21st-century Japanese male singers
21st-century Japanese singers